James Russell Tuten (July 23, 1911 – August 16, 1968) was an American politician who served as a U.S. Representative from Georgia, serving two terms from 1963 to 1967.

Early life and career
Tuten was born on a farm in Appling County, Georgia. He was educated in county public schools, South Georgia College at Douglas, and Georgia Southern College at Statesboro.  Tuten engaged in farming, teaching, bricklaying, and business as a building contractor.

He was active in the government of Brunswick, Georgia, serving as a city commissioner from 1956 to 1962, and then mayor from 1958 and 1962.
Tuten served as chairman of the board of trustees, Brewton–Parker College at Mount Vernon, Georgia.

Congress
He was elected as a Democrat to the Eighty-eighth and Eighty-ninth Congresses (January 3, 1963 – January 3, 1967).
However, he was an unsuccessful candidate for renomination in 1966.

Tuten was appointed as cochairman of the Coastal Plains Regional Commission in 1967.

Death
He died in Falls Church, Virginia, August 16, 1968.
Tuten was interred in Palmetto Cemetery, Brunswick, Georgia.

References

1911 births
1968 deaths
Georgia (U.S. state) city council members
Mayors of places in Georgia (U.S. state)
Democratic Party members of the United States House of Representatives from Georgia (U.S. state)
People from Appling County, Georgia
People from Brunswick, Georgia
People from Mount Vernon, Georgia
20th-century American politicians